What the World Needs Now Is Love is the sixth studio album by American country music artist Wynonna, released in 2003 as her first album for Curb / Asylum Records. It produced four chart singles; the first of these, which was the title track, reached #14 on the Billboard country charts. It was followed by "Heaven Help Me" at #37 and "Flies on the Butter" (a duet with her mother Naomi Judd, one half of The Judds) at #33. The fourth and final single, a cover of Foreigner's "I Want to Know What Love Is", did not enter the country charts, but reached #14 on Hot Adult Contemporary Tracks and #12 on Hot Dance Airplay.

Also covered on this album is Elvis Presley's "Burning Love"; Wynonna's cover was previously included in the soundtrack to the 2002 film Lilo & Stitch. "I Will Be" was cut by Lila McCann on her 1999 album Something in the Air. Additionally, "You Are" was featured in the soundtrack to the 2003 film Someone Like You, which starred Wynonna's half-sister, Ashley Judd. Finally, "Flies on the Butter" was previously recorded by Lari White on her 1998 album Stepping Stone.

Track listing

Personnel 
 Wynonna Judd – lead vocals
 Tim Akers – keyboards (1–7, 9, 12, 13), accordion (14)
 Matt Rollings – keyboards (1), acoustic piano (3, 4, 12)
 Steve Nathan – keyboards (2, 5–9, 11)
 Greg Phillinganes – keyboards (10)
 Craig Young – keyboards (13)
 Tom Bukovac – electric guitar (1, 5–9, 11)
 Gordon Kennedy – electric guitar (1, 3, 8, 11, 13)
 John Willis – acoustic guitar (1), banjo (1)
 Dann Huff – electric guitar (2–9, 11, 12), acoustic guitar (14)
 Jerry McPherson – electric guitar (2, 5, 6, 7, 9), guitars (10)
 Don Potter – acoustic guitar (2–7, 12, 14)
 Biff Watson – acoustic guitar (3, 4, 12)
 Jeff Beck – lead guitar (6)
 Paul Franklin – steel guitar (1–4, 6, 8, 12, 13)
 Steve Mackey – bass (1)
 Willie Weeks – bass (2, 5, 6, 7, 9, 10)
 Jimmie Lee Sloas – bass (3, 4, 6, 7, 12)
 Mike Brignardello – bass (8, 11)
 Glenn Worf – bass (13)
 Steve Potts – drums (1)
 John Robinson – drums (2–8, 11, 12)
 Chris McHugh – drums (9, 13)
 Narada Michael Walden – drums (10)
 Eric Darken – percussion (2, 4–9, 11, 13, 14)
 David Huff – loop programming (2, 5, 6, 7)
 Jonathan Yudkin – fiddle (1, 14), mandolin (4, 14), string arrangements (4), cello (4, 14), viola (4), violin (4), harp (14)
 Lisa Cochran – backing vocals (1, 8, 12)
 Chris Rodriguez – backing vocals (1)
 Bob Bailey – backing vocals (2, 3, 5, 6, 7, 9, 10, 12, 13, 14)
 Kim Fleming – backing vocals (2, 3, 5, 6, 7, 9, 10, 12, 14)
 Vicki Hampton – backing vocals (2, 3, 5, 6, 7, 9, 10, 12, 13, 14)
 Naomi Judd – lead and harmony  vocals (4)
 Perry Coleman – backing vocals (8, 11, 12)
 Bekka Bramlett – backing vocals (11)

Strings (Tracks 2 & 6)
 Ronn Huff – string arrangements (2)
 David Campbell – string conductor, string arrangements (6)
 Suzie Katayama – string contractor
 Reggie Hamilton and Oscar Meza Jr. – bass
 Larry Corbett, Paula Hochhalter, Dan Smith and Rudy Stein – cello 
 Karen Elaine-Bakunin, John Hayhurst, Carole Mukogawa and Evan Wilson – viola 
 Darius Campo, Susan Chatman, Joel Derouin, Charles Everett, Geraldo Hilera, Norman Hughes, Peter Kent, Sara Perkins, Bob Peterson, Michele Richards and John Wittenberg – violin

Production 
 Wynonna Judd – producer, arrangements (1-5, 7, 8, 9, 11, 12, 14), executive producer (13)
 Dann Huff – producer (1-5, 7, 8, 9, 11, 12, 14), arrangements (1-5, 7, 8, 9, 11, 12, 14), executive producer (13), remixing (13)
 Gordon Kennedy – producer (13)
 Wayne Kirkpatrick – producer (13)
 Narada Michael Walden – producer (6, 10), arrangements (6, 10)
 Jeff Balding – recording (1, 2, 3, 5, 7, 8, 9, 11-14), mixing (1-5, 7, 8, 9, 11, 12, 14)
 Derek Bason – recording (1, 2, 3, 5, 7, 8, 11, 12, 14), digital editing (1-5, 7, 8, 11-14)
 Jed Hackett – recording (1, 2, 3, 5, 7, 8, 11-14), recording assistant (1, 2, 3, 5, 7, 8, 9, 11-14), mix assistant (1, 2, 3, 5, 7, 8, 9, 11-14)
 Mark Hagen – recording (1-5, 7, 8, 11-14), track engineer (10)
 Steve Churchyard – string recording (2, 6)
 John Hudson – Jeff Beck's guitar recording (6)
 John Jaszcz – vocal engineer (10)
 David Frazer – mixing (10)
 Jesse Amend – recording assistant (1, 2, 3, 5, 7, 8, 11, 12, 14)
 David Bryant – recording assistant (1, 2, 3, 5, 7, 8, 11, 12, 14), mix assistant (1-5, 7, 8, 11, 12, 14)
 J.C. Monterrosa – recording assistant (1, 2, 3, 5, 7, 8, 11-14)
 Charlie Paakkari – assistant engineer (2, 6)
 Leslie Richter – recording assistant (9), mix assistant (9)
 Grant Green – assistant engineer (10, 14)
 Andrew Leavitt – assistant engineer (10)
 Melissa Mattey – assistant engineer (10)
 Christopher Rowe – digital editing (1, 2, 3, 5, 7, 8, 11-14)
 Dino Herrmann – Pro Tools engineer (2, 6)
 Jim Reitzel – Pro Tools engineer (10), mix assistant (10)
 Adam Ayan – mastering 
 Mike "Frog" Griffith – production coordinator (1-5, 7, 8, 9, 11, 12, 14)
 John Coulter Design – graphic design 
 Alan R. Mayor – photography
 Rod Spicer – photography 
 Camille – photography 
 Gibson Guitars – front cover guitar
 Robert Vertica – hair
 Billy B. – make-up
 Todd Handshaw – stylist 
 Kerry Hansen – management

Studios
 Recorded at Emerald Entertainment, Arrowhead Studios and Ocean Way Recording (Nashville, Tennessee); The Sound Kitchen (Franklin, Tennessee).
 Strings recorded at Capitol Studios (Hollywood, California).
 Mixed at Emerald Entertainment; Tarpan Studios (San Rafael, California).
 Mastered at Gateway Mastering (Portland, Maine).

Charts

Weekly charts

Year-end charts

References

2003 albums
Wynonna Judd albums
Albums arranged by David Campbell (composer)
Albums produced by Narada Michael Walden
Albums produced by Dann Huff
Asylum-Curb Records albums